Wood is a natural material produced by the growth of plants, mainly trees and shrubs.

Wood may also refer to:

Places

United States
 Wood, Iowa, an unincorporated community
 Wood, Missouri, an unincorporated community
 Wood, North Carolina, an unincorporated community
 Wood, Pennsylvania, an unincorporated community
 Wood, South Dakota, a town
 Wood County, Texas
 Wood, West Virginia, an unincorporated community
 Wood, Wisconsin, a town 
 Wood County, Ohio
 Wood County, West Virginia
 Wood County, Wisconsin
 Wood Creek (Mohawk River), in West Schuyler, New York, U.S.
 Wood Township (disambiguation)

Elsewhere
 The Wood, New Zealand, a suburb of Nelson, South Island, New Zealand
 The Wood, Surbiton, a public park in Kingston upon Thames, London, England

People
 List of people with surname Wood
 Wood (surname)
 Wood (Kent cricketer, 1789), an English cricketer
 Wood (Kent cricketer, 1828), an English cricketer
 Wood Boulden (1811–1876)
 Wood B. Kyle (1915–2000)

Arts, entertainment, and media

Music
 Wood (Moxy Früvous album)
 Wood (Widespread Panic album)
 The Wood (soundtrack), a soundtrack album from the 1999 film
 "Wood", a song by Juliana Hatfield from Whatever, My Love
 "Wood", a song by Second Person from The Elements
 Woodwind instrument, also called wood

Radio stations 
 WOOD (AM), a radio station in Grand Rapids, Michigan
 WOOD-FM, a radio station in Muskegon, Michigan

Other arts, entertainment, and media
 The Wood, a 1999 American coming of age film
 The Wood (Max Ernst), a 1927 painting
 Wood (magazine), an American woodworking periodical
 WOOD-TV, a television station in Grand Rapids, Michigan
 "The Wood" (Slacker Cats), a television episode

Ships
  or USS Leedstown (APA-56), a transport later reclassified as an attack transport launched in 1943
 , a destroyer in commission from 1919 to 1930
 , a list of ships

Other uses 
 Wood (crater), a lunar impact crater
 Wood (festival), an annual folk and roots music festival, and environmental gathering
 Wood (golf), a type of club used in golf
 Wood (Wu Xing), one of the five Chinese elements
 Woodland or wood, or woods, a small forest
 Wood, the trading name of John Wood Group, a multinational energy services company

See also
 Justice Wood (disambiguation)
 Wood Lake (disambiguation)
 Wood River (disambiguation)
 Woodie (disambiguation)
 Woods (disambiguation)
 Woody (disambiguation)